Murty may refer to:

Places 
Mırtı (disambiguation), places in Azerbaijan

People 
Akshata Murty (born 1980), Indian businesswoman 
Graeme Murty (born 1974), English-born Scottish footballer
K. Satchidananda Murty (1924-2011), Indian philosopher and professor
M. Ram Murty (born 1953), Indo-Canadian mathematician
Sudha Murty (born 1951), Indian educator, author and philanthropist
Tad Murty (1937-1981), Indian-Canadian oceanographer

See also 
Murti
Krishnamurti